The Lancia 18/24 HP Dialfa was the second model built by Lancia, produced in 1908. The car was based on the four cylinder Lancia Alfa, now with a straight-6 engine. Only  23 examples were built, all in 1908.

References
Lancia by Michael Frostick, 1976. 

Dialfa-18HP
Cars introduced in 1908
Brass Era vehicles